James Walter Butler MBE RA (25 July 1931 – 26 March 2022) was a British sculptor most famous for his 1980 statue of Richard III in Leicester.

Butler was educated at Maidstone Grammar School and studied art at Saint Martin's School of Art and the Royal College of Art. For ten years he was a professional stone carver. He taught sculpture and drawing at the City and Guilds of London Art School and was visiting professor to the Royal Academy Schools. He was elected to the Royal Academy of Arts in 1964 and was a member of the Royal West of England Academy and fellow of the Royal British Society of Sculptors.

Butler's works exist in private collections throughout the world and he undertook numerous public commissions. He designed the current version of the British Great Seal.
Butler was appointed Member of the Order of the British Empire (MBE) in the 2009 New Year Honours.

Butler was asked to commission a memorial in dedication to the 167th Infantry Regiment of the World War I Rainbow Division in New Croix Rouge Farm, France.

Gallery

References

External links
James Butler Website
Guardian obituary

1931 births
2022 deaths
Academics of Imperial College London
Alumni of Saint Martin's School of Art
Alumni of the Royal College of Art
English sculptors
English male sculptors
Members of the Order of the British Empire
Members of the Royal West of England Academy
People educated at Maidstone Grammar School
Royal Academicians
20th-century British sculptors
21st-century sculptors
Fellows of the Royal British Society of Sculptors